"Pienso en Ti" is a song by Mexican singer Joss Favela and American singer Becky G. Released by Sony Music Latin on October 19, 2018, it was written by Joss Favela. It was released as the third single from his second album, Caminando (2019).

Music video
The music video was directed by Kenneth O’ Brien. The music video was released alongside the song on October 19.

Live performances 
Favela performed the song with Becky G at the Latin American Music Awards of 2018.

Charts

References

2018 singles
2018 songs
Becky G songs
Sony Music Latin singles
Male–female vocal duets
Spanish-language songs